Legion Bridge (Czech: Most Legií) is a historic bridge over the Vltava in Prague, Czech Republic, named after the Czechoslovak Legion.

External links
 

Bridges in Prague
Bridges over the Vltava